Nunnykirk is a settlement and civil parish in the county of Northumberland, England.

Nunnykirk is the location of Nunnykirk Hall, a former nunnery country house and current school.

Governance 
Nunnykirk was formerly a township in Nether Witton parish, in 1866 Nunnykirk became a civil parish in its own right, on 1 April 1955 the parishes of Coatyards, Ewesley, Healey and Combhill, Ritton Colt Park, Ritton White House, Todburn and Wingates were abolished and merged with Nunnykirk.

References

External links

Villages in Northumberland
Civil parishes in Northumberland